Sklabiná (formerly Szklabonya until 1899 and Kürtabony until 1910) is a village and municipality in the Veľký Krtíš District of the Banská Bystrica Region of southern Slovakia.

Demographics
According to the 2011 census, the municipality had 844 inhabitants, of whom 789 were ethnically Slovaks, 9 Czechs, 9 Hungarians, 7 Roma and 21 unspecified.

Notable residents
 Kálmán Mikszáth, Hungarian novelist, journalist, and politician
 Lajos Zs. Nagy, Hungarian journalist, poet

References

External links
 
 
http://www.statistics.sk/mosmis/eng/run.html

Villages and municipalities in Veľký Krtíš District